Homorthodes is a genus of moths of the family Noctuidae.

Selected species
 Homorthodes affurata (Hampson, 1905)
 Homorthodes carneola McDunnough, 1943
 Homorthodes communis (Dyar, 1904)
 Homorthodes discreta (Barnes & McDunnough, 1916)
 Homorthodes dubia (Barnes & McDunnough, 1912)
 Homorthodes euxoiformis (Barnes & McDunnough, 1913)
 Homorthodes flosca (Smith, 1906)
 Homorthodes fractura (Smith, 1906)
 Homorthodes furfurata (Grote, 1874)
 Homorthodes gigantoides (Barnes & McDunnough, 1912)
 Homorthodes hanhami (Barnes & McDunnough, 1911)
 Homorthodes lindseyi - Southern Scurfy Quaker Moth
 Homorthodes mania (Strecker, 1899)
 Homorthodes noverca (Grote, 1878)
 Homorthodes perturba McDunnough, 1943
 Homorthodes rectiflava (Smith, 1908)
 Homorthodes reliqua (Smith, 1899)
 Homorthodes rubritincta McDunnough, 1943
 Homorthodes uniformis (Smith, 1888)

References
Natural History Museum Lepidoptera genus database
Homorthodes at funet

Hadeninae